Seungwoo Han (born 3 July 1983) is a South Korean shooter. He represented his country at the 2016 Summer Olympics.

Han attended Kyungnam University. While a student, he represented South Korea in the junior division at the 2002 ISSF World Shooting Championships, where he and teammates Park Ji-su and Park Jin-gu won South Korea's first gold medal in the junior men's 10m team air pistol event.

References

External links

1983 births
Living people
Kyungnam University alumni
South Korean male sport shooters
Shooters at the 2016 Summer Olympics
Olympic shooters of South Korea
ISSF pistol shooters
Sportspeople from Daegu